The Aztec Soccer Club is a full-scale developmental soccer organization located on the North Shore of Massachusetts.  The Aztec Soccer Club is structured like a pyramid, running programs for all age groups and genders. The club runs Soccer Tots and Youth Clinics for ages 18 months – 6 years, youth teams ages 7–19 and the pro-caliber Boston Aztec men's and women's amateur teams.

Boston Aztec men's and women's teams play in three separate leagues. The men play indoors in the winter in the Premier Arena Soccer League (PASL) New England Division, and outdoors in the summer in the National Premier Soccer League (NPSL) Northeast Division.  The women play outdoors over the summer in the Eastern Conference – North Division of the Women's Premier Soccer League.

Aztec men's and women's teams feature high-level players who have been award-winning high school and collegiate players, and some with professional and international experience.  Recent examples include Meotis Erikson (WPSL; Boston Breakers – WUSA; Notre Dame All-American), Kareem Smith (PASL; Trinidad and Tobago U20 National Team; Univ. of S. Florida Big East All-Star).

The men – indoor 
The Boston Aztec indoor team was established in 2002 and joined the PASL in 2004.  They have reached the New England Regional final four straight years (2004–07), winning Back-to-Back-to-Back PASL Regional Championships in 2005-07.  In 2005, in Albany, New York the Aztecs won their first PASL National Championship.  Prior to joining the PASL, the Aztecs won the American Indoor Soccer League (AISL) crown in 2003, and the Northeast Arena League (NEAL) title in 2002.  The PASL is the top feeder system indoor league for the Major Indoor Soccer League (MISL), the indoor soccer professional league in the United States.  The team plays its home games at Soccer ETC in Beverly, Massachusetts.

The men – outdoors 
The Boston Aztec NPSL team began its inaugural season in the summer of 2007. The NPSL, the fourth tier of the American Soccer Pyramid, is expanding to the east coast for the first time in ’07, and the Aztec squad will be one of the Northeast Division's charter members.  In 2006, the Aztecs fielded a team that played in the Eastern Mass. Men's Soccer Association (EMMSA), advancing to the semi-finals.  The squad also played exhibitions against the NH Phantoms and Vermont Voltage from the professional USL-2 league, and earned a 3-3 draw with the Phantoms. The home field for their inaugural season in the NPSL in 2007 has yet to be announced.

The women 
The Boston Aztec women's team began play in 2005 in the WPSL, which was ranked as the #1 women's soccer league in the United States by Women's World Football Ranking Service in 2005.  In 2006, the Aztec women earned their first winning record (3-2-6) and played the eventual 2006 WPSL Champion Long Island Fury to two 0-0 draws.  In 2006, they played home games in Salem, MA at Salem St. College's Alumni Field.

The kids and coaches 
The Aztec Soccer Club's Premier (U15-U18) and Jr. Aztec (U11-U14) boys and girls teams play in the New England Premiership (NEP) and compete in state, regional and national tournaments.  Aztec players have been selected for US youth regional and national player pools, been named high school and college All-Americans and All-Regions, have been captains and all-stars for their high school and college programs.  In 2006, over 70 Aztec youth players were named high school All-Stars in Massachusetts and New Hampshire.  In addition, the club has an active program of training for kids from 18 months – 10 years as well.  The Aztec coaching staff consists of educated, certified and knowledgeable coaches with a high-level of playing, coaching and administrative experience at the high school, college, professional and international coaches.

External links
Aztec Soccer
PASL
WPSL
NPSL

 
Soccer clubs in Massachusetts